The 2016 FIBA U20 Women's European Championship Division B was the 12th edition of the Division B of the Women's European basketball championship for national under-20 teams. It was held in Podgorica, Montenegro, from 9 to 17 July 2016. Slovenia women's national under-20 basketball team won the tournament.

Participating teams

  (15th place, 2015 FIBA Europe Under-20 Championship for Women Division A)

  (14th place, 2015 FIBA Europe Under-20 Championship for Women Division A)

  (16th place, 2015 FIBA Europe Under-20 Championship for Women Division A)

First round
In the first round, the teams were drawn into four groups. The first two teams from each group advance to the quarterfinal round, the other teams will play in the classification round for 9th to 13th place.

Group A

Group B

Group C

Group D

Classification round for 9th–13th place

Quarterfinal round
In this round, the teams play in two groups. The first two teams from each group advance to the semifinals, the other teams will play in the 5th–8th place playoffs.

Group E

Group F

5th–8th place playoffs

5th–8th place semifinals

7th place match

5th place match

Championship playoffs

Semifinals

3rd place match

Final

Final standings

References

External links
FIBA official website

2016
2016–17 in European women's basketball
International youth basketball competitions hosted by Montenegro
Sports competitions in Podgorica
FIBA U20
July 2016 sports events in Europe